Sten Olov “Olle” Åhlund (22 August 1920 – 11 February 1996) was a Swedish footballer, who played for Degerfors IF. He played 34 games for the Swedish national team and won the bronze medal at the 1952 Summer Olympics.

References

External links

1920 births
1996 deaths
People from Degerfors Municipality
Swedish footballers
Sweden international footballers
Olympic footballers of Sweden
Footballers at the 1952 Summer Olympics
Olympic bronze medalists for Sweden
1950 FIFA World Cup players
Olympic medalists in football
Swedish football managers
Degerfors IF managers
Medalists at the 1952 Summer Olympics
Allsvenskan players
Degerfors IF players
Association football midfielders
Sportspeople from Örebro County